Puerto Rican rapper Don Omar has won 40 awards from 60 nominations, being one of the most successful artists of the genre. He has been nominated for 11 Latin Grammy Awards, 1 Grammy Awards, 30 Billboard Latin Music Awards, 4 Billboard Music Awards, 19 Lo Nuestro Awards, 4 International Dance Music Awards, 2 American Music Awards, 2 Premios People en Español, 2 MTV Video Music Awards and 1 Premio MTV Latinoamérica. He has received 3 Latin Grammy Awards, 20 Billboard Latin Music Awards, 1 Billboard Music Award, 3 Lo Nuestro Awards, 8 Viña del Mar International Song Festival Awards and 1 Guinness World Record.

Rivera was born and raised in Carolina, Puerto Rico, the oldest son of William Landrón and Luz Antonia Rivera. From an early age, he showed interest in the music of Vico C and Brewley MC. During his youth, he became an active member of a Protestant church, Iglesia Evangélica Restauración en Cristo in Bayamón where he occasionally offered sermons. However, after four years, he left the church to dedicate himself to singing. Although his base genre is reggaeton, he also took other roots in latin pop and electropop since 2008.

He released 7 studio albums between 2003 and 2018, including the Billboard Latin Music Award winner King of Kings (2006) for the Reggaeton Album of the Year. Rivera was also responsible for the production of his 4 collaboration albums, including the Latin Grammy Award winner Meet the Orphans 2: New Generation (2012) for Best Urban Music Album. His fifth studio album, The Last Don II was released in June 2015. The artist made record in the history for Billboard. The artist was the Guinness World Record for the video most views in YouTube.

Latin Grammy Awards

Billboard Latin Music Awards

Billboard Music Awards

Lo Nuestro Awards

Viña del Mar International Song Festival Awards

International Dance Music Awards

American Music Awards

Premios People en Español

MTV Video Music Awards

Premios MTV Latinoamérica

Guinness World Records

References 

Omar, Don